A tiara is a form of crown.

Tiara may also refer to:

Arts & Music 
 Tiara (album), by Seventh Wonder
 "Tiara" (poem), by Mark Doty
 A song from the 1999 album Rockology
 T-ara, South Korean girl group

Machines 
HMS Tiara (P351), British submarine
Tiara Yachts, US-based boat manufacturer
Tiara Air, Aruba-based airline
Continental Tiara series of aircraft engines
 A name used in some markets for the Toyota Corona's T20 and T30 series sedan models
Proton Tiara, Malaysian car

Business 
Tiara Records, US-based record label

Other 
TIARA (database), genomics database

People with the name Tiara 
Tiara Andini (born 2001), Indonesian singer
Tiara Jacquelina (born 1967), Malaysian actress
Tiara Malcom (born 1983), American college basketball coach
Tiara Rosalia Nuraidah (born 1993), Indonesian badminton player
Tiara Andini Prastika (born 1996), Indonesian cyclist
Tiara Purifoy, participant in American Idol (season 3)

In Fiction
 Diamond Tiara, a character in My Little Pony: Friendship is Magic
 Lady Tiara, protagonists of gothic magical girl Shamanic Princess
 Tiara, the name of the tiara from the video game Super Mario Odyssey

See also
 Taira (disambiguation)
 Tierra (disambiguation)